Hoods is a hardcore punk band from Sacramento, California. Formed in 1994 by Mike "Mikey Hood" Mraz who later added Logan Murray, Tony Goodloe and Billy Gaffney. Hoods shows influences such as Madball, Sick of It All, Minor Threat and Cro-Mags. They released their first EP entitled Once Again in 1996 and concentrated on live performances. After numerous fights between fans and an altercation between a couple of the band members and a police officer, the band left the Sacramento area. The band moved to the San Francisco Bay Area playing shows with groups such as Powerhouse, Redemption 87 and Skin Lab. 
In 1997 after a disagreement with bandmates and his mother's illness Gaffney left and was replaced by Jeremy. Murray and Goldoe then left and were replaced by Ben and Mario.  

In 2005, Hoods were dropped from Victory Records after a dispute over royalties and management. They signed with Eulogy Recordings in 2005 and released The King Is Dead. The group released a new album, Ghetto Blaster, on April 24, 2007. The release Pit Beast dropped in May 2009 after the band signed with I Scream Records. The cover art for this album was done by Craig Holloway, who created cover art for acts such as Negative Approach and Obituary among others. In 2014 the band signed with Artery Recordings and released "Gato Negro".

Band members

Current
Mikey Hood - Vocals
Jon (the jew)  Korn - Guitar 
Marty Cole - Guitar
Elijah Martinez - Drums
Twig - Bass

Former
Craig Spinelli - Drums
Rob McCarthy - Drums
Evan Krejci - Guitar
T-Gibbs - Vocals
Stephen Lauck - Guitar
Ben Garcia - Vocals
Jeremy Roberts - Drums
Mario - Bass
Navene Koperweis - Drums
Whiteboy Ben - Drums
Nick Reinhart - Guitar
Nate raider - Bass
Nick Lang "Lurch" - Guitar
Zack Peterson - Guitar
Mike Spaulding - Vocals
Eddy Lloreda - Drums

Original Members
Mikey Hood - Guitar, vocals
Tony Goodloe - Vocals
Logan Murray - Bass
Billy Gaffney - Drums

Discography

References

External links
Hoods at Facebook
Hoods at Artery Recordings

Metalcore musical groups from California
Victory Records artists
Musical groups from Sacramento, California
Hardcore punk groups from California
Eulogy Recordings artists